Luis Mariano de Larra y Wetoret (1830, in Madrid – 1901, in Madrid) was a Spanish writer, son of journalist Mariano José de Larra. Noted as the librettist of numerous zarzuelas such as El Toro y el Tigre, Un embuste y una boda, Todo con raptos, El cuello de la camisa, con el Sr. Suricalday amongst others, his most famous work is undoubtedly El barberillo de Lavapiés (1874), set to music by Francisco Asenjo Barbieri.

Larra worked for the Ministry of Development and contributed to various publications of the time such as the Gaceta de Madrid, from which he resigned to devote himself exclusively to literature. He also wrote many comedies, among which is his much successful La oración de la tarde, drama in three acts and verse whose protagonist Don Diego de Mendoza, dragging his righteous indignation for reasons of honor, implements the evangelical precept of forgiving every injury. It premiered at Teatro del Circo on 25 November 1858 with great acclaim.

Works

En Palacio y en la calle
Las tres noblezas
Quien á cuchillo mata
A caza de cuervos! con el Sr. Larrea
Una nube de verano
El amor y el interés
La pluma y la espada
La paloma y los halcones
La planta exótica
El Rey del mundo
La oracion de la tarde
La primera piedra

References

1830 births
1891 deaths
Writers from Madrid
Spanish opera librettists
Spanish male dramatists and playwrights
19th-century Spanish dramatists and playwrights
19th-century male writers